Buffalo Springs may refer to:

Places

Kenya
Buffalo Springs National Reserve, a protected area in the Isiolo District of Eastern Province, Kenya

United States
Buffalo Springs, New Mexico, an unincorporated community
Buffalo Springs, North Dakota, an unincorporated community
Buffalo Springs, Texas, a village in Lubbock County, Texas 
Buffalo Springs, Clay County, Texas, an unincorporated community
Buffalo Springs, Mecklenburg County, Virginia, an unincorporated community 
Buffalo Springs, Nelson County, Virginia, an unincorporated community
Buffalo Springs Airport, an airport
Buffalo Springs Historical Archeological District, a historical archaeological district